The name Winifred has been used for two tropical cyclones worldwide.

In the Eastern Pacific: 
 Hurricane Winifred (1992) – made landfall southeast of Manzanillo, Colima, causing minor damage. 

In the Australian Region: 
 Cyclone Winifred (1986) – one of the worst cyclones to make landfall in northern Queensland on record. 

Pacific hurricane set index articles
Australian region cyclone set index articles